Bakhyt Turlykhanuly Sultanov (Baqyt Tūrlyhanūly Sūltanov; born 29 November 1971) is a Kazakh statesman, Deputy Prime Minister — Minister of Trade and Integration from January 11 to August 15, 2022, and Minister of Trade and Integration on June 17, 2019. Former Finance Minister, former Deputy Head of the Presidential Administration of the Republic of Kazakhstan, former Deputy Prime Minister of the Republic of Kazakhstan, former Äkim of Astana.

Biography

Early life and education 
Sultanov was born in Alma Ata (now Almaty). In 1988, he graduated from the Republican Physics and Mathematics Boarding School, in 1994 from the Satbayev University with a degree in electrical engineering and in 1995, from the Narxoz University with a degree in economics.

Career 
Sultanov began his career in 1994 as a leading economist in the corporation and licensing department of the Financial Market Securities Department at the Ministry of Finance where he progressed from senior economist to being director of the department.

From September 2002 to June 2003, Sultanov was the director of the Department of Budgetary Policy and Planning of the Ministry of Economy and Budget Planning. 

In June 2003, he became Vice Minister of Economy and Budget Planning and served that position until being appointed as the chairman of the Agency on Statistics of the Republic of Kazakhstan in February 2006. 

In January 2007, he became Vice Minister of Finance until 10 August 2007, when he was appointed as the Minister of Economy and Budget Planning.

On 13 March 2010, by a presidential decree, Sultanov was appointed as assistant to the President of Kazakhstan. 

From 21 January 2012, he served as a deputy head of the Presidential Administration.

On 6 November 2013, Sultanov was appointed as a Deputy Prime Minister of Kazakhstan and Minister of Finance. 

He served the post until becoming the äkim of Astana on 11 September 2018. 

Since 17 June 2019, Sultanov has been serving as Minister of Trade and Integration.

From January 11, 2022 - August 15, 2022 - appointed Deputy Prime Minister - Minister of Trade and Integration of the Republic of Kazakhstan.

Since October 6, 2022 — Member of the Board for Competition and Antimonopoly Regulation of the Eurasian Economic Commission

Awards

References

1971 births
Living people
Ministers of Finance (Kazakhstan)
Ministers of Economy (Kazakhstan)
Government ministers of Kazakhstan
People from Almaty
Nur Otan politicians
Narxoz University alumni
Deputy Prime Ministers of Kazakhstan